Septidelphis is an extinct genus of oceanic dolphins belonging to the family (Delphinidae). The type species is Septidelphis morii.

Species
†Septidelphis morii  Bianucci 2013

Fossil records
This genus is known in the fossil records from the late Zanclean–early Piacenzian (Pliocene) (age range: from 3.81 to 3.19 million years ago). Fossils are found in the marine strata of Piedmont (northern Italy).

Description
It shows  an extreme posterior widening of the dorsal opening of the mesorostral canal.

References

Oceanic dolphins